In the Eurocode series of European standards (EN) related to construction, Eurocode 9: Design of aluminium structures (abbreviated EN 1999 or, informally, EC 9) describes how to design aluminium alloy structures.  It complies with the principles and requirements for the safety and serviceability of structures, the basis of their design and verification that are given in EN 1990 – Basis of structural design. It sets requirements for structural integrity, including strength, serviceability, durability and fire resistance.

EN 1999 is intended to be used in conjunction with:

EN 1990: Eurocode - Basis of structural design;
EN 1991: Eurocode 1 - Actions on structures;
European Standards for construction products relevant for aluminium structures;
EN 1090-1 : Execution of steel structures and aluminium structures – Part 1 : General technical delivery conditions for structural steel and aluminium components;
EN 1090-3 : Execution of steel structures and aluminium structures – Part 3 : Technical requirements for aluminium structures.

Eurocode 9 has five parts:

 EN 1999-1-1: General structural rules
 EN 1999-1-2: Structural fire design
 EN 1999-1-3: Structures susceptible to fatigue
 EN 1999-1-4: Cold-formed structural sheeting
 EN 1999-1-5: Shell structures

References

External links 
 Eurocodes: Building the Future The European Commission Website on the EN Eurocodes
EN 1999: Design of aluminium structures
EN 1999: Design of aluminium structures - "Eurocodes: Background and applications" workshop

01999
9